Alter Ego is the fourth studio album by American singer Tyrese. It was released on December 12, 2006 through J Records. The album was formatted as a double album. The production on the album was handled by multiple producers including Mannie Fresh, Lil Jon, Scott Storch, R. Kelly, Tricky Stewart and Bryan-Michael Cox among others. The album also features guest appearances by The Game, Method Man, Snoop Dogg, Too Short, Kurupt, Lil Scrappy, David Banner, R. Kelly, Lil Jon and Mannie Fresh.

Alter Ego was supported by two singles:  "One" and "Turn Ya Out". The album received generally mixed reviews from music critics and received small commercial success. It debuted at number 23 on the US Billboard 200 and number four on the US Top R&B/Hip-Hop Albums chart, selling 116,000 copies in its first week.

Music and development
The album was formatted as a double album, intending to market Tyrese's contrasting facets of artistry. The first disc contains slow and midtempo pop and R&B songs, while the second, Black-Ty (named after his on-stage rapper alter ego), focuses on hip hop and uptempo beats.

Singles
The album released two singles, which both of them ultimately missed the US Billboard Hot 100 chart. The album first single "One" peaked at number 23 on the US Hot R&B/Hip-Hop Songs chart dated February 17, 2007. The second single "Turn Ya Out" peaked at number 70 on the chart dated February 3, 2007.

Commercial performance
Alter Ego debuted at number 23 on the US Billboard 200 chart, selling 116,000 copies in its first week. This became Tyrese's lowest charting-album to date. The album also debuted at number four on the US Top R&B/Hip-Hop Albums chart, becoming Tyrese's fourth top-ten album on this chart.

Track listing

Samples
"Roses" contains a sample from "The Makings of You", written by Curtis Mayfield. 
"U Scared" contains a portion of the composition "Go to Church", written by Ice Cube, Calvin Broadus, and Jonathan Smith. 
"Fly Away" contains a sample from "Come Go with Me", written by Leon Huff and Kenneth Gamble.

Charts

Weekly charts

Year-end charts

References

External links
[ Alter Ego] at Allmusic

2006 albums
Tyrese Gibson albums
J Records albums
Albums produced by Bryan-Michael Cox
Albums produced by Scott Storch
Albums produced by R. Kelly
Albums produced by Lil Jon
Albums produced by Mannie Fresh
Albums produced by the Underdogs (production team)
Albums produced by Tricky Stewart